Sikh Phulwari is a monthly Punjabi and Hindi magazine of the Sikh Missionary College in Ludhiana, India. The magazine aims at the revival of Sikhism and preaching the message of the Sikh Gurus. It is the largest circulating Sikh religious monthly.

History
Sikh Phulwari was started in Punjabi in August 1980. The Hindi edition of the magazine was launched later.

References

External links
 Sikh Phulwari
 Sikh Missionary College, Ludhiana

1980 establishments in India
Ludhiana
Monthly magazines published in India
Magazines established in 1980
Mass media in Punjab, India
Sikh mass media